Sahure (also Sahura, meaning "He who is close to Re") was a pharaoh of ancient Egypt and the second ruler of the Fifth Dynasty (c. 2465 – c. 2325 BC). He reigned for about 13 years in the early 25th century BC during the Old Kingdom Period. Sahure's reign marks the political and cultural high point of the Fifth Dynasty. He was probably the son of his predecessor Userkaf with Queen NeferhetepesII, and was in turn succeeded by his son Neferirkare Kakai.

During Sahure's rule, Egypt had important trade relations with the Levantine coast. Sahure launched several naval expeditions to modern-day Lebanon to procure cedar trees, slaves and exotic items. His reign may have witnessed the flourishing of the Egyptian navy, which included a high-seas fleet as well as specialized racing boats. Relying on this, Sahure ordered the earliest attested expedition to the land of Punt, which brought back large quantities of myrrh, malachite and electrum. Sahure is shown celebrating the success of this venture in a relief from his mortuary temple which shows him tending a myrrh tree in the garden of his palace named "Sahure's splendor soars up to heaven". This relief is the only one in Egyptian art depicting a king gardening. Sahure sent further expeditions to the turquoise and copper mines in Sinai. He also ordered military campaigns against Libyan chieftains in the Western Desert, bringing back livestock to Egypt.

Sahure had a pyramid built for himself in Abusir, thereby abandoning the royal necropolises of Saqqara and Giza, where his predecessors had built their monuments. This decision was possibly motivated by the presence of the sun temple of Userkaf in Abusir, the first such temple of the Fifth Dynasty. The Pyramid of Sahure is much smaller than the pyramids of the preceding Fourth Dynasty but the decoration and architecture of his mortuary temple is more elaborate. The Ancient Egyptians recognized this particular artistic achievement and tried to emulate the reliefs in the tombs of subsequent kings and queens. The architects of Sahure's pyramid complex introduced the use of palmiform columns (columns whose capital has the form of palm leaves), which would soon become a hallmark of ancient Egyptian architecture. The layout of his mortuary temple was also innovative and became the architectural standard for the remainder of the Old Kingdom period. Sahure is also known to have constructed a sun temple called "The Field of Ra", and although it is yet to be located it is presumably also in Abusir.

Sahure was the object of a funerary cult, the food offerings for which were initially provided by agricultural estates set up during his reign. This official, state-sponsored cult endured until the end of the Old Kingdom. Subsequently, during the Middle Kingdom period, Sahure was venerated as a royal ancestor figure but his cult no longer had dedicated priests. During the New Kingdom, Sahure was equated with a form of the goddess Sekhmet for unknown reasons. The cult of "Sekhmet of Sahure" had priests and attracted visitors from all over Egypt to Sahure's temple. This unusual cult, which was celebrated well beyond Abusir, persisted up until the end of the Ptolemaic period nearly 2500 years after Sahure's death.

Family

Parentage 

Excavations at the pyramid of Sahure in Abusir under the direction of Miroslav Verner and Tarek El-Awady in the early 2000s provide a picture of the royal family of the early Fifth Dynasty. In particular, reliefs from the causeway linking the valley and mortuary temples of the pyramid complex reveal that Sahure's mother was queen NeferhetepesII. She was the wife of pharaoh Userkaf, as indicated by the location of her pyramid immediately adjacent to that of Userkaf, and bore the title of "king's mother". This makes Userkaf the father of Sahure in all likelihood. This is further reinforced by the discovery of Sahure's cartouche in the mortuary temple of Userkaf at Saqqara, indicating that Sahure finished the structure started most probably by his father.

This contradicts older, alternative theories according to which Sahure was the son of queen Khentkaus I, believed to be the wife of the last pharaoh of the preceding Fourth Dynasty, Shepseskaf and a brother to either Userkaf or Neferirkare.

Children 

Sahure is known to have been succeeded by Neferirkare Kakai, who until 2005 was believed to be his brother. That year, a relief originally adorning the causeway of Sahure's pyramid and showing Sahure seated in front of two of his sons, Ranefer and Netjerirenre, was discovered by Verner and another Egyptologist, Tarek El-Awady. Next to Ranefer's name the text "Neferirkare Kakai king of Upper and Lower Egypt" had been added, indicating that Ranefer was Sahure's son and had assumed the throne under the name "Neferirkare Kakai" at the death of his father. Since both Ranefer and Netjerirenre are given the titles of "king's eldest son", Verner and El-Awady speculate that they may have been twins with Ranefer born first. They propose that Netjerirenre may have later seized the throne for a brief reign under the name "Shepseskare", although this remains conjectural. The same relief further depicts queen Meretnebty, who was thus most likely Sahure's consort and the mother of Ranefer and Netjerirenre. Three more sons, Khakare, Horemsaf, and Nebankhre are shown on reliefs from Sahure's mortuary temple, but the identity of their mother(s) is unknown.

Netjerirenre bore several religious titles corresponding to high-ranking positions in the court and which suggest that he may have acted as a vizier for his father. This is debated, as Michel Baud points out that at the time of Sahure, the eviction of royal princes from the vizierate was ongoing if not already complete.

Reign

Chronology

Relative chronology 

The relative chronology of Sahure's reign is well established by historical records, contemporary artifacts and archeological evidence, which agree that he succeeded Userkaf and was in turn succeeded by Neferirkare Kakai. An historical source supporting this order of succession is the Aegyptiaca (Αἰγυπτιακά), a history of Egypt written in the 3rd century BC during the reign of Ptolemy II (283–246 BC) by Manetho. No copies of the Aegyptiaca have survived and it is now known only through later writings by Sextus Julius Africanus and Eusebius. According to the Byzantine scholar George Syncellus, Africanus wrote that the Aegyptiaca mentioned the succession "Usercherês → Sephrês → Nefercherês" at the start of the Fifth Dynasty. Usercherês, Sephrês (in Greek, Σϵϕρής), and Nefercherês are believed to be the Hellenized forms for Userkaf, Sahure and Neferirkare, respectively. Manetho's reconstruction of the early Fifth Dynasty is in agreement with those given on two more historical sources, the Abydos king list where Sahure's cartouche is on the 27th entry, and the Saqqara Tablet where Sahure's name is given on the 33rd entry. These lists of kings were written during the reigns of Seti I and RamsesII, respectively.

Reign length 

The Turin canon, a king list written during the Nineteenth Dynasty in the early Ramesside era (1292–1189 BC), credits him with a reign of twelve years five months and twelve days. In contrast, the near contemporary royal annal of the Fifth Dynasty known as the Palermo Stone records his second, third, fifth and sixth years on the throne as well as his final 13th or 14th year of reign and even records the day of his death as the 28th of Shemu I, which corresponds to the end of the ninth month. Taken together these pieces of information indicate that the royal annal of the Fifth Dynasty recorded a reign of 13 years 5months and 12 days for Sahure, only one year more than given by the Turin Canon and close to the 13 years figure given in Manetho's Aegyptiaca.

Sahure appears in two further historical records: on the third entry of the Karnak king list, which was made during the reign of Thutmose III (1479–1425 BC) and on the 26th entry of the Saqqara Tablet dating to the reign of Ramses II (1279–1213 BC). Neither of these sources give his reign length. The absolute dates of Sahure's reign are uncertain but most scholars date it to the first half of the 25th century BC, see note 1 for details.

Foreign activities

Trade and tribute 

Historical records and surviving artifacts suggest that contacts with foreign lands were numerous during Sahure's reign. Furthermore, these contacts seem to have been mostly economic rather than military in nature. Reliefs from his pyramid complex show the return of a naval expedition to Lebanon, the boats laden with the trunks of precious cedar trees. Other ships are represented loaded with "Asiatics", both adults and children who were either slaves, or merchants, greeting Sahure:

The same relief strongly suggests that interpreters were on board the ships, tasked with translations to facilitate trade with foreign lands.
A relief, unique to Egyptian art, depicts several Syrian brown bears, presumably brought back from the Levantine coast by seagoing ships as well. These bears appear in association with 12 red-painted one-handled jars from Syria. The Egyptologists Karin Sowada and William Stevenson Smith have proposed that, taken together, the bears and jars are likely to constitute a tribute.

Trade contacts with Byblos took place during Sahure's reign. Excavations of the temple of Baalat-Gebal yielded an alabaster bowl inscribed with Sahure's name. The layout of the fourth phase of this temple might even have been influenced by the architecture of Sahure's valley temple, although this remains debated.
There is further corroborating evidence for trade with the wider Levant during the Fifth Dynasty, several stone vessels being inscribed with cartouches of pharaohs of this dynasty discovered in Lebanon. So much so that the archeologist Gregory Mumford points to the fact that "Sahure is [the] best attested [king] for international relations" and has the highest number of texts inscribed in Sinai proportionally to his reign length.

In his last year, Sahure sent the first documented expedition to the fabled land of Punt, probably along the Somalian coast. The expedition, which is conjectured to have departed Egypt from the harbor of Mersa Gawasis, is reported on the Palermo Stone where it is said to have come back with 80,000 of an unspecified measure of myrrh, along with malachite, 6000 measures of electrum and 2600 or 23,020 staves, possibly made of ebony.
In his last year Sahure sent another expedition abroad, this time to the copper and turquoise mines of Wadi Maghareh and Wadi Kharit in Sinai, which had been active since at least the beginning of the Third Dynasty. This expedition, also mentioned by the Palermo stone, brought back over 6000 units of turquoise to Egypt and produced two reliefs in Sinai, one of which shows Sahure in the traditional act of smiting Asiatics and boasting "The Great God smites the Asiatics of all countries". In parallel with these activities, diorite quarries near Abu Simbel were exploited throughout Sahure's reign.

Military campaigns 

Sahure's military career is known primarily from reliefs in his mortuary complex. It apparently consisted of campaigns against Libyans from Tjemehu, a land possibly located in the northern Western desert. These campaigns are said to have yielded livestock in huge numbers and Sahure is shown smiting local chieftains. The historical veracity of these depictions remains in doubt as such representations are part of the standard iconography meant to exalt the king. The same scene of the Libyan attack was used two hundred years later in the mortuary temple of PepiII (2284–2184 BC) and in the temple of Taharqa at Kawa, built some 1800 years after Sahure's lifetime. In particular, the same names are quoted for the local chieftains. Therefore, it is possible that Sahure too was copying an even earlier representation of this scene. Nonetheless, several overseers of the Western Nile Delta region were nominated by Sahure, a significant decision as these officials occupied an administrative position that existed only irregularly during the Old Kingdom period and which likely served to provide "traffic regulation across the Egypto-Libyan border". At the same time, Sahure's mortuary temple presents the earliest known mention of pirates raiding the Nile Delta, possibly from the coast of Epirus.

Sahure's pretensions regarding the lands and riches surrounding Egypt are encapsulated in several reliefs from his mortuary temple which show the god Ash telling the king "I will give you all that is in this [Libya] land", "I give you all hostile peoples with all the provisions that there are in foreign lands" and "I grant thee all western and eastern foreign lands with all the Iunti and the Montiu bowmen who are in every land".

Activities in Egypt

Religious activities 

The majority of Sahure's activities in Egypt recorded on the Palermo stone are religious in nature. This royal annal records that in the "year of the first time of traveling around", Sahure journeyed to the Elephantine fortress, where he may have received the submission of the Nubian chiefs in a ceremonial act connected with the commencement of his reign. The fashioning of six statues of the king as well as the subsequent opening of the mouth ceremonies are also reported.
During Sahure's fifth year on the throne, the Palermo stone mentions the making of a divine barge, possibly in Heliopolis, the appointment of 200 priests and the exact quantity of daily offerings of bread and beer to Ra (138, 40 and 74 measures in three temples), Hathor (4 measures), Nekhbet (800 measures) and Wadjet (4800 measures) fixed by the king. Also reported are gifts of lands to temples of between 1and 204 arouras (0.7 to nearly 140 acres). Concerning Lower Egypt, the stone register corresponding to this reign gives the earliest known mention of the city of Athribis in the Delta region.

Further indication of religious activities lies in that Sahure is the earliest known king to have used the Egyptian title of Nb írt-ḫt. This title, possibly meaning "Lord of doing effective things", indicates that he personally performed physical cultic activities to ensure the existence and persistence of the Maat, the Egyptian concept of order and justice. This title remained in use until the time of Herihor, some 1500 years later. Sahure's reign is also the earliest during which the ceremony of the "driving of the calves" is known to have taken place. This is significant in the context of the progressive emergence of the cult of Osiris throughout the Fifth Dynasty, as this ceremony subsequently became an integral part of the Osiris myth. In subsequent times, the ceremony corresponded to Seth's threshing of Osiris by driving calves trampling fields of barley.

Sahure reorganized the cult of his mother, NepherhetepesII, whose mortuary complex had been built by Userkaf in Saqqara. He added an entrance portico with four columns to her temple, so that the entrance was not facing Userkaf's pyramid any more.

Building and mining activities 

Archeological evidence suggests that Sahure's building activities were mostly concentrated in Abusir and its immediate vicinity, where he constructed his pyramid and where his sun temple is probably located. Also nearby was the palace of Sahure, called Uetjes Neferu Sahure, "Sahure's splendor soars up to heaven". The palace is known from an inscription on beef tallow containers discovered in February 2011 in Neferefre's mortuary temple. A second palace, "The Crown of Sahure appears", is known from an inscription in the tomb of his chief physician.
Both palaces, if they were different buildings, were likely on the shores of the Abusir lake.

The stones for Sahure's buildings and statues were quarried throughout Egypt. For example, the limestone cladding of the pyramid comes from Tura, while the black basalt used for the flooring of Sahure's mortuary temple comes from Gebel Qatrani, near the Faiyum in Middle Egypt. South of Egypt, a stele bearing Sahure's name was discovered in the diorite quarries located in the desert north-west of Abu Simbel in Lower Nubia.

Further mining and quarrying expeditions may be inferred from indirect evidence. An inscription of Sahure in the Wadi Abu Geridah in the Eastern desert as well as other Old Kingdom inscriptions there suggest that iron ore was mined in the vicinity since the times of the Fourth Dynasty. The lower half of a statue with the name of the king was discovered in 2015 in Elkab, a location possibly connected with expeditions to the Eastern desert and south of Egypt to Nubia. Sahure's cartouche has been found in graffiti in Tumas and on seal impressions from Buhen at the second cataract of the Nile in Lower Nubia.

Development of the Egyptian Navy 

Sahure's reign may have been a time of development for the Egyptian navy. His expeditions to Punt and Byblos demonstrate the existence of a high seas navy and reliefs from his mortuary complex are described by Shelley Wachsmann as the "first definite depictions of seagoing ships in Egypt", some of which must have been 100-cubits long (c. 50m, 170ft).
Because of this, Sahure has been credited by past scholars with establishing the Egyptian navy. It is recognized today that this is an overstatement: fragmentary reliefs from Userkaf's temple depict numerous boats, while a high seas navy must have existed as early as the Third Dynasty. The oldest known sea harbor, Wadi al-Jarf on the Red Sea was operating under Khufu. Finally, there is the distinct possibility that some of the reliefs are copied from earlier examples. Nonetheless, Sahure remains the earliest known ruler to have depicted, and thus possibly made use of, sea power for transporting troops over the Mediterranean sea, to Syria.

The extensive nautical scenes from Sahure's mortuary complex are sufficiently detailed to show that specialized racing boats for the military and perhaps for ceremonial training were built at the time. They also give the earliest depiction of specific rope uses aboard ships, such as that of a hogging-truss.
and that the masts employed at the time were bipodal, resembling an inverted Y.
Further rare depictions include the king standing in the stern of a sailing boat with a highly decorated sail, and one of only two reliefs from ancient Egypt showing men aboard a ship paddling in a wave pattern, possibly during a race.

Court life

Officials 

Several high officials serving Sahure during his lifetime are known from their tombs as well as from the decoration of the mortuary temple of the king. Niankhsekhmet, chief physician of Sahure and first known rhinologist in history, reports that he asked the king that a false door be made for his [Niankhsekhmet's] tomb, to which the king agreed. Sahure had the false door made of fine Tura limestone, carved and painted blue in his audience-hall, and made personal daily inspections of the work. The king wished a long life to his physician, telling him:

A similar though much less detailed anecdote is reported by Khufuankh, who was overseer of the palace and singer of the king.
Other officials include Hetepka, who was keeper of the diadem and overseer of the hairdressers of the king,
Pehenewkai, priest of the cult of Userkaf during the reigns of Sahure and Neferirkare Kakai, then vizier for the latter; Persen, a mortuary priest in the funerary cult of Sahure's mother Nepherhetepes; and Washptah, a priest of Sahure, then vizier of Neferirkare Kakai. The high-official Ptahshepses, probably born during the reign of Menkaure, was high priest of Ptah and royal manicure under Sahure, later promoted to vizier by Nyuserre Ini.

Two viziers of Sahure are known: Sekhemkare, royal prince, son of Khafre and vizier under Userkaf and Sahure; and Werbauba, vizier during Sahure's reign, attested in the mortuary temple of the king.

Evolution of the high offices 

Sahure pursued Userkaf's policy of appointing non-royal people to high offices. This is best exemplified by the office of vizier, which was exclusively held by princes of royal blood with the title of "King's son" since the mid-Fourth Dynasty and up until the early Fifth Dynasty. Toward the end of this period princes were progressively excluded from the highest office, an evolution undoubtedly correlated with changes in the nature of kingship. This process, possibly initiated by Menkaure because of dynastic disputes, seems to have been completed by Sahure's time as from then onwards no royal prince was promoted to vizier. Those already in post were allowed to keep their status and so in the early part of Sahure's reign vizier Sekhemkare was a "King's son" while his successor, Werbauba, seems to have been non-royal. In response to this change, the state administration began its expansion as it included more and more non-royal people.

Concurrently with these developments, architectural and artistic innovations relating to tombs of private individuals can be dated to Sahure's reign. These including torus molding and cornices for false doors, first found in Persen's tomb. This feature would subsequently become common and here demonstrates the particularly high esteem in which Persen must have been held by the king. Another innovation is the depiction of small unusual offerings such as that of seven sacred oils on false doors, first found in Niankhsekhmet's tomb. The canonical list of offerings was also developed during or shortly before Sahure's time in the tombs of the royal family, and spread to those of non-royal high-officialsthe earliest of whom was Seshemnefer Iunder Sahure.

Sun temples

Sekhetre 

Sahure built or started to build a temple dedicated to the sun god Ra, the second such temple of the Fifth Dynasty. Yet to be located, it is known to have existed thanks to an inscription on the Palermo stone where it is called Sekhetre (also spelt Sekhet Re), meaning "The Field of Ra" as well as mentions of it in 24 tombs of administration officials. A few limestone blocks bearing reliefs which once adorned the temple have been found embedded in the walls of the mortuary complex of Nyuserre Ini, Sahure's fourth successor. This suggests either that these blocks were leftovers from the construction of the temple, or as Wener Kaiser has posited, that Nyuserre dismantled Sahure's temple, using it as a quarry for construction materials because it was largely unfinished. Indeed, the rather meager evidence for the Sekhetre leads Miroslav Verner to propose that it never fully functioned as a sun temple.

New analyses of the verso of the Palermo stone performed in 2018 by the Czech Institute of Archeology enabled the reading of further inscriptions mentioning precisely the architecture of the temple as well as lists of donations it received, establishing firmly that it was a distinct entity from the earlier sun temple of Userkaf, the Nekhenre but leaving its ultimate fate uncertain. Further precision as to the architecture of the temple may be inferred from the absence of the obelisk determinative in some hieroglyphic variants of the name Sekhetre and its presence in others. For Anthony Spalinger this possibly indicates that Sahure's sun temple was effectively built and acquired such an obelisk at some point after its construction, perhaps after Sahure's reign.

Nekhenre 

Userkaf was the first king to build a sun temple in Abusir. Known to the ancient Egyptians as the Nekhenre, or "Fortress of Re", it was unfinished at his death. Construction works continued in at least four building phases, the first of which may have taken place under Sahure, and then under his successors Neferirkare Kakai and Nyuserre Ini.

Pyramid complex 

Sahure built a pyramid complex for his tomb and funerary cult, named Khaba Sahura, which is variously translated as "The Rising of the Ba Spirit of Sahure", "The Ba of Sahure appears", "Sahure's pyramid where the royal soul rises in splendor", or "In glory comes forth the soul of Sahure". The builders and artisans who worked on Sahure's mortuary complex lived in an enclosed pyramid town located next to the causeway leading up to Sahure's pyramid and mortuary temple. The town later flourished under Nyuserre and seems to have still been in the existence during the First Intermediate Period.

In terms of the size, volume, and the cheap construction techniques employed, Sahure's pyramid exemplifies the decline of pyramid building. At the same time, the quality and variety of the stones employed in other parts of the complex increased, and the mortuary temple is considered to be the most sophisticated one built up to that time.
With its many architectural innovations, such as the use of palmiform columns, the overall layout of Sahure's complex would serve as the template for all mortuary complexes constructed from Sahure's reign until the end of the Sixth Dynasty, some 300 years later. The highly varied colored reliefs decorating the walls of the entire funerary complex display a quality of workmanship and a richness of conception that reach their highest level of the entire Old Kingdom period.

Location 

Sahure chose to construct his pyramid complex in Abusir, thereby abandoning both Saqqara and Giza, which had been the royal necropolises up to that time. A possible motivation for Sahure's decision was the presence of the sun temple of Userkaf, something which supports the hypothesis that Sahure was Userkaf's son.
Following Sahure's choice, Abusir became the main necropolis of the early Fifth Dynasty, as pharaohs Neferirkare Kakai, Neferefre, Nyuserre Ini and possibly Shepseskare built their pyramids there. In their wake, many smaller tombs belonging to members of the royal family were built in Abusir, with the notable exceptions of those of the highest-ranking members, many of whom chose to be buried in Giza or Saqqarah.

Mortuary temple 

Sahure's mortuary temple was extensively decorated with an estimated  of fine reliefs. This extensive decoration seems to have been completed within Sahure's lifetime.
The walls of the entire -long causeway were also covered with polychrome bas-reliefs. Miroslav Bárta describes the reliefs as "the largest collection known from the third millennium BCE".

Many surviving fragments of the reliefs which decorated the walls of the mortuary complex are of very high quality and much more elaborate than those from preceding mortuary temples.
Several of the depictions are unique in Egyptian art. These include a relief showing Sahure tending a myrrh tree (Commiphora myrrha) in his palace in front of his family; a relief depicting Syrian brown bears and another showing the bringing of the pyramidion to the main pyramid and the ceremonies following the completion of the complex. The high craftmanship of the reliefs is here manifested by the finely rounded edges of all figures, so that they simultaneously blend in with the background and stand out clearly.
Reliefs are sufficiently detailed to permit the identification of the animals shown, such as hedgehogs and jerboas, and even show personified plants such as corn represented as a man with corn-ears instead of hair.

The many reliefs of the mortuary, causeway and valley temples also depict, among other things, Sahure hunting wild bulls and hippopotamuses, Sahure being suckled by Nekhbet,
the earliest depictions of a king fishing and fowling, a counting of foreigners by or in front of the goddess Seshat, which Egyptologist Mark Lehner believes was "meant to ward off any evil or disorder", the god Sopdu "Lord of the Foreign Countries" leading bound Asiatic captives, and the return of an Egyptian fleet from Asia, perhaps Byblos. Some of the low relief-cuttings in red granite are still in place at the site. Among the seminal innovations of Sahure's temple are the earliest relief depictions of figures in adoration, either standing or squatting with both arms raised, their hands open and their palms facing down.

The mortuary temple featured the first palmiform columns of any Egyptian temple, massive granite architraves inscribed with Sahure's titulary overlaid with copper, lion-headed waterspouts, black basalt flooring and granite dados.

Pyramid 

The pyramid of Sahure reached  at the time of its construction, much smaller than the pyramids of the preceding Fourth Dynasty. Its inner core is made of roughly hewn stones organized in steps and held together in many sections with a thick mortar of mud. This construction technique, much cheaper and faster to execute than the stone-based techniques hitherto employed, fared much worse over time. Owing to this, Sahure's pyramid is now largely ruined and amounts to little more than a pile of rubble showing the crude filling of debris and mortar constituting the core, which became exposed after the casing stones were stolen in antiquity.

While the core was under construction, a corridor was left open leading into the shaft where the grave chamber was built separately and later covered by leftover stone blocks and debris. This construction strategy is clearly visible in later unfinished pyramids, in particular the Pyramid of Neferefre. This technique also reflects the older style from the Third Dynasty seemingly coming back into fashion after being temporarily abandoned by the builders of the five great pyramids at Dahshur and Giza during the Fourth Dynasty.

The entrance at the north side is a short descending corridor lined with red granite followed by a passageway ending at the burial chamber with its gabled roof comprising large limestone beams of several tons each. Today all of these beams are fractured, which weakens the pyramid structure. Fragments of a basalt sarcophagus, likely Sahure's, were found here in the burial chamber when it was first entered by John Shae Perring in the mid 19th century.

Legacy

Artistic and architectural legacy 

The painted reliefs covering the walls of Sahure's mortuary temple were recognized as an artistic achievement of the highest degree by the Ancient Egyptians. A New Kingdom inscription found in Abusir for example poetically compares the temple to the heaven lit by full moon.

Subsequent generations of artists and craftsmen tried to emulate Sahure's reliefs, using them as templates for the tombs of later kings and queens of the Old Kingdom period. The layout of Sahure's high temple was also novel and it became the standard template for all subsequent pyramid complexes of the Old Kingdom. Some of its architectural elements, such as its palmiform columns, became hallmarks of Egyptian architecture.

This trend continued to hold in later times. For example, in the Middle Kingdom, Senusret I had reliefs for his temple directly copied from those of Sahure. He also chose to follow the innovative layout of Sahure's complex once again. At the time, Senusret I's decision was in stark contrast with the burial customs of the 11th Dynasty pharaohs, who were buried in saff tombs. These consisted of an open courtyard fronting a row of entrances into subterranean corridors and chambers dug in the hillsides of El-Tarif and Deir el-Bahari, near Thebes.

Cults

Old Kingdom 

Sahure was the object of a funerary cult from the time of his death and which continued until the end of the Old Kingdom, some 300 years later. At least 22 agricultural estates were established to produce the goods necessary for providing the offerings to be made for this cult. Decorated reliefs from the upper part of the causeway represent the procession of over 150 personified funerary domains created by and for Sahure, demonstrating the existence of a sophisticated economic system associated with the king's funerary cult. The enormous quantities of offerings pouring into the mortuary and sun temples of Sahure benefitted other cults as well, such as that of Hathor, which had priests officiating on the temple premises.

Several priests serving the mortuary cult or in Sahure's sun temple during the later Fifth and Sixth Dynasties are known thanks to inscriptions and artifacts from their tombs in Saqqara and Abusir.
These include Tjy, overseer of the sun temples of Sahure, Neferirkare, Neferefre and Nyuserre; Neferkai priest of Sahure's funerary cult; Khabauptah priest of Sahure, Neferirkare, Neferefre, and Niuserre,
Atjema, priest of the sun temple of Sahure during the Sixth Dynasty; Khuyemsnewy, who served as priest of the mortuary cult of Sahure during the reigns of Neferirkare and Nyuserre; Nikare, priest of the cult of Sahure and overseer of the scribes of the granary during the Fifth Dynasty. Further priests are known, such as Senewankh, serving in the cults of Userkaf and Sahure and buried in a mastaba in Saqqara;
Sedaug, a priest of the cult of Sahure, priest of Ra in the sun-temple of Userkaf and holder of the title of royal acquaintance; Tepemankh, priest of the cults of kings of the Fourth to early Fifth Dynasty including Userkaf and Sahure, buried in a mastaba at Abusir.

Middle Kingdom 

No priest serving in the funerary cult of Sahure is known from the Middle Kingdom period. Evidence from this period rather come from works undertaken in the Karnak temple by 12th Dynasty pharaoh Senusret I (fl. 20th century BC), who dedicated statues of Old Kingdom kings including one of Sahure. The statue and the accompanying group of portraits of deceased kings indicates the existence of a generic cult of royal ancestor figures, a "limited version of the cult of the divine" as Jaromir Málek writes.
Sahure is shown enthroned, wearing a pleated skirt and a round curly wig. Both sides of the throne bear inscriptions identifying the work as a portrait of Sahure made on the orders of Senusret I.

Sahure's legacy had endured sufficiently by the Middle Kingdom period that he is mentioned in a story of the Westcar Papyrus, probably written during the 12th Dynasty although the earliest extent copy dates to the Seventeenth Dynasty. The papyrus tells the mythical story of the origins of the Fifth Dynasty, presenting kings Userkaf, Sahure and Neferirkare Kakai as three brothers, sons of Ra and a woman named Rededjet destined to supplant Khufu's line.

New Kingdom: emergence of Sekhmet of Sahure 

As a deceased king, Sahure continued to receive religious offerings during the New Kingdom as part of the standard cult of the royal ancestors. For example, Sahure is present on the Karnak king list, a list of kings inscribed on the walls of the Akhmenu, the Karnak temple of ThutmoseIII. Unlike other ancient Egyptian king lists, the kings there are not listed in chronological order. Rather, the purpose of the list was purely religious, its aim being to name the deceased kings to be honored in the Karnak temple.

In the second part of the Eighteenth Dynasty and during the Nineteenth Dynasty numerous visitors left inscriptions, stelae and statues in the temple.
These activities were related to a cult then taking place in the mortuary temple of Sahure since the time of ThutmoseIII. This cult was devoted to the deified king in a form associated with the goddess Sekhmet named "Sekhmet of Sahure".
For example, the scribe Ptahemuia and fellow scribes visited Sahure's temple in the 30th year of RamsesII's reign (c. 1249 BC) to ask Sekhmet to grant them a long life of 110 years. The reason for the appearance of this cult during the New Kingdom is unknown. In any case, the cult of Sekhmet of Sahure was not a purely local phenomenon as traces of it were found in the Upper Egyptian village of Deir el-Medina, where it was celebrated during two festivals taking place every year, on the 16th day of the first month of Peret and on the 11th day of the fourth month of that season.

During the same period, prince Khaemwaset, a son of RamsesII, undertook works throughout Egypt on pyramids and temples which had fallen into ruin, possibly to appropriate stones for his father's construction projects while ensuring a minimal restoration for cultic purposes. Inscriptions on the stone cladding of the pyramid of Sahure show that it was the object of such works at this time. This renewed attention had negative consequences as the first wave of dismantlement of the Abusir monuments, particularly for the acquisition of valuable Tura limestone, arrived with it. Sahure's mortuary temple may have been spared at this time due to the presence of the cult of Sekhmet. The cult's influence likely waned after the end of RamsesII's reign, becoming a site of local worship only.

Third intermediate, late and Ptolemaic periods 

During the Twenty-fifth Dynasty (744–656 BC) at the end of the Third Intermediate Period, some of Sahure's temple reliefs were copied by Taharqa, including images of the king crushing his enemies as a sphinx.
Shortly after, under the Twenty-sixth Dynasty (664–525 BC) of the Late Period, a statue of Sahure was among a group of statues of Old Kingdom kings hidden in a cachette of the Karnak temple, testifying to some form of cultic interest up to that time.
In parallel, a new period of dismantlement of the pyramids of Abusir took place, yet Sahure's was once again spared. This might be because of the cult of Sekhmet of Sahure the temple hosted well into the Ptolemaic period (332–30 BC), albeit with a very reduced influence. Several graffiti dating from the reigns of Amasis II (570–526 BC), Darius II (423–404 BC) and up until the Ptolemaic period attest to continued cultic activities on the site. For example, a certain Horib was "Priest of Sekhmet of the temple of Sekhmet of Sahure" under the Ptolemaic dynasty.

The dismantlement of Sahure's pyramid started in earnest in the Roman period, as shown by the abundant production of mill-stones, presence of lime production facilities and worker shelters in the vicinity.

Notes

References

Bibliography 

 
 
 
 
 
 
 
 
 
 
 
 
 
 
 
 
 
 
 
 
 
 
 
 
 
 
 
 
 
 
 
 
 
 
 
 
 
 
 
 
 
 
 
 
 
 
 
 
 
 
 
 
 
 
 
 
 
 
 
 
 
 
 
 
 
 
 
 
 
 
 
 
 
 
 
 
 
 
 
 
 
 
 
 
 
 
 
 
 
 
 
 
 
 
 
 
 
 
 
 
 
 
 
 
 
 
 
 
 
 
 
 
 
 
 
 
 
 
 
 
 
 
 
 
 
 
 
 
 

25th-century BC Pharaohs
Pharaohs of the Fifth Dynasty of Egypt
Pharaohs